Edward Douglas may refer to:
Edward Douglas (bishop) (1901–1967), Scottish Catholic bishop
Edward M. Douglas (1903–1983), American businessman
Edward Bruce Douglas (1886–1946), American sculptor
Edward Morehouse Douglas (1855–1932), American topographer